PRAKASH R JADHAV Shiv Sena politician from Nagpur District,. He was a member of the 14th Lok Sabha of India. He represented the Ramtek constituency of Maharashtra as a member of the Shiv Sena (SS) political party, after resignation of Subodh Mohite from Lok Sabha and Shiv Sena and joining Congress.

Positions held
 2007: Elected to 14th Lok Sabha
 2018: Appointed as Nagpur Chief, Shiv Sena

References

External links
 Official biographical sketch in Parliament of India website

Living people
People from Maharashtra
India MPs 2004–2009
Marathi politicians
Lok Sabha members from Maharashtra
Shiv Sena politicians
People from Nagpur district
Year of birth missing (living people)